Heyne is a German surname. Notable people with the surname include:

Benjamin Heyne (1770–1819), botanist, naturalist, and surgeon
Christian Gottlob Heyne (1729–1812), German classical scholar and archaeologist
Dirk Heyne (born 1957), German football player and manager
Ernst Bernard Heyne (1825–1881), German botanist
Karel Heyne (1877–1947), Dutch botanist
Moritz Heyne (1837–1906), Germanic linguist
Paul Heyne  (1931–2000), American economist

See also
Heyne (singer), South Korean singer
Heyne Verlag, a German imprint of publishers Random House
Heine, also a surname
Chayyim, the basis for this name and similar spellings

German-language surnames
Surnames from given names